Kevin Powell (born September 13, 1955 in Trail, British Columbia) is a former professional Canadian football offensive lineman who played 12 seasons in the Canadian Football League for five different teams. Number one overall pick in 1979 CFL Draft by the Toronto Argonauts.

Powell played college football at Utah State University, where he was named PCAA all conference selection 1978.

Powell was involved in one of the most significant quarterback trades in CFL history as the Toronto Argonauts sought future Hall of Famer Condredge Holloway for their sputtering offence and the Ottawa Rough Riders sought the promising young Powell and $100 000.

CFL All Star: 1983, 1985, 1986, 1987.

References 

1955 births
Living people
Sportspeople from Trail, British Columbia
Players of Canadian football from British Columbia
Canadian football offensive linemen
Utah State Aggies football players
Toronto Argonauts players
Ottawa Rough Riders players
Edmonton Elks players
BC Lions players
Calgary Stampeders players
Canadian players of American football